Dolichoderus debilis is a species of ant in the genus Dolichoderus. Described by Emery in 1890, the species is found in many countries in two continents, including Bolivia, Brazil, Colombia, Costa Rica, French Guiana, Guatemala, Guyana, Panama, Suriname, Trinidad and Tobago and Venezuela.

References

Dolichoderus
Hymenoptera of North America
Hymenoptera of South America
Insects described in 1890